The 2004 NCAA Division I Men's Swimming and Diving Championships took place March 25–27, 2004 in the Nassau County Aquatic Center, East Meadow, New York. Twenty-one champions were declared.

Along with 2000, this year's meet was held short course meters (25 meters), rather than the NCAA's traditional short-course yards format (25 yards). This allowed for World Records to be set at the meet.

Team Championships results

Medal table

Medalists
WR denotes World Record
CR denotes Championship Record
NR denotes National Record

Swimming

|-
|50 m freestyle

|-
|100 m freestyle

|-
|200 m freestyle

|-
|400 m freestyle

|-
|1500 m freestyle

|-
|100 m backstroke

|-
|200 m backstroke

|-
|100 m breaststroke

|-
|200 m breaststroke

|-
|100 m butterfly

|-
|200 m butterfly

|-
|200 m IM

|-
|400 m IM

|- valign=top
|4 × 50 mfreestyle relay

|- valign=top
|4 × 100 mfreestyle relay

|- valign=top
|4 × 200 mfreestyle relay

|- valign=top
|4 × 50 mmedley relay

|- valign=top
|4 × 100 mmedley relay

|}

Diving

|-
|1 m springboard

|-
|3 m springboard

|-
|Platform

|}

References

NCAA Division I Men's Swimming and Diving Championships
Sports competitions in New York (state)
NCAA Division I Men's Swimming and Diving Championships
NCAA Division I Men's Swimming and Diving Championships
NCAA Division I Men's Swimming And Diving Championships
NCAA Division I Men's Swimming and Diving Championships